Josué Domínguez Ramos (born 20 November 1996) is a swimmer from the Dominican Republic. He competed in the 2020 Summer Olympics.

References

External links
 BYU Cougars bio

1996 births
Living people
People from Santiago de los Caballeros
Swimmers at the 2020 Summer Olympics
Dominican Republic male swimmers
Olympic swimmers of the Dominican Republic
Swimmers at the 2014 Summer Youth Olympics
Swimmers at the 2019 Pan American Games
Pan American Games competitors for the Dominican Republic
BYU Cougars men's swimmers
Competitors at the 2014 Central American and Caribbean Games
20th-century Dominican Republic people
21st-century Dominican Republic people